Fumikazu Kimura (木村 文紀, born September 13, 1988) is a Japanese professional baseball outfielder for the Hokkaido Nippon-Ham Fighters in Japan's Nippon Professional Baseball. He previously played in NPB for the Saitama Seibu Lions.

Professional career

Saitama Seibu Lions
On November 21, 2006, Kimura was drafted by the Seibu Lions first overall pick high school draft in the 2006 Nippon Professional Baseball draft.

On August 31, 2007, he made his debut as a relief pitcher in the Pacific League against the Tohoku Rakuten Golden Eagles.

In the match against the Orix Buffaloes on July 31, 2011, Kimura pitched as a relief pitcher and became his first Winning pitcher.

In 2007-2012 season, he pitched 41 games in the Pacific League.

In 2013 season, Kimura converted from Pitcher to Outfielder. On May 23, 2013, Kimura recorded his first hit. And he recorded his first home run and RBI against the Yokohama DeNA BayStars in the Interleague play on May 28. He played in 11 games in the Pacific League.

In 2014 season, Kimura finished the regular season in 100 games with a batting average of .215, a 10 home runs, a RBI of 27, and a 16 stolen bases.

In 2015 season, he finished the regular season in 49 games with a batting average of .195, a 5 home runs, a RBI of 12, and a one stolen bases.

In 2016 season, he played only 28 games in the Pacific League.

In 2017 season, Kimura finished the regular season in 105 games with a batting average of .201, a 2 home runs, a RBI of 13, and a 7 stolen bases.

In 2018 season, he finished the regular season in 75 games with a batting average of .260, a 3 home runs, a RBI of 12, and a 7 stolen bases.

In 2019 season, Kimura finished the regular season in 130 games with a batting average of .220, a 10 home runs, a RBI of 38, and a 16 stolen bases.

In 2020 season, he finished the regular season in 90 games with a batting average of .231, a 8 home runs, a RBI of 33, and a 5 stolen bases.

Hokkaido Nippon-Ham Fighters
On August 12, 2021, Kimura and Ryusei Satoh was traded to the Hokkaido Nippon Ham Fighters in exchange for Katsuhiko Kumon and Shota Hiranuma.

References

External links

 Career statistics - NPB.jp

1988 births
Living people
Baseball people from Tokyo
Hokkaido Nippon-Ham Fighters players
Nippon Professional Baseball outfielders
Seibu Lions players
Saitama Seibu Lions players
Japanese expatriate baseball players in the United States
Japanese expatriate baseball players in Australia
Melbourne Aces players
West Oahu Canefires players